The Oslo Jewish Museum aims at informing about Jews in Norway. It was established as a foundation in 2003, supported by the Det mosaiske trossamfunn and Oslo City Museum.

The museum was officially opened by Haakon, Crown Prince of Norway on September 8, 2008. The location was selected as one where there had been a substantial Jewish population. A synagogue stood on the same street from 1921 to 1942, and many of the Jews immigrating to Norway from the Baltics lived in the vicinity.

Nomination for Museum of the Year
In 2014 the museum was nominated for Museumforbundet's Museum of the Year Award—alongside KODE and Telemark Museum.

See also
 Trondheim Synagogue
 Oslo Synagogue
 History of the Jews in Norway
 The Holocaust in Norway

References

External links 

 Oslo Jewish Museum

Museums in Oslo
Oslo
Jews and Judaism in Oslo